"Monkberry Moon Delight" is a song written by English musician Paul McCartney and his wife Linda, from their 1971 album Ram.

Composition and arrangement
"Monkberry Moon Delight" is in the key of C minor. McCartney's vocals are accompanied by a chord progression consisting of Cm, Gm7, and G7 chords (i–v7–V7). In the chorus, which features Linda in a more active role on vocals, her and McCartney's singing is supported by Cm and Fm chords. This leads to an A♭7–G7–Cm harmonic succession, with the A♭7 functioning as an augmented sixth chord (Ger+6).  McCartney's gruff, distinctive vocalization was influenced by Screamin' Jay Hawkins, who later covered the song.

Lyrics
McCartney said of the song's title, which also appears in the song's lyrics:
When my kids were young they used to call milk "monk" for whatever reason that kids do—I think it's magical the way that kids can develop better names for things than the real ones. In fact, as a joke, Linda and I still occasionally refer to an object by that child-language name. So, monk was always milk, and monkberry moon delight was a fantasy drink, rather like "Love Potion No. 9", hence the line in the song, "sipping monkberry moon delight". It was a fantasy milk shake.

Reception
Upon Rams release, Anthony Boot of The Kingston Whig-Standard referred to "Monkberry Moon Delight" as "a bit of a waste" on what he considered to otherwise be "an excellent album."

In 2020, Rolling Stone ranked "Monkberry Moon Delight" #22 on their ranking of the 40 greatest McCartney songs from his solo career; the list's compilers refer to the song as one of McCartney's "genius obscurities".

Ultimate Classic Rock critic Dave Swanson rated "Monkberry Moon Delight" as McCartney's most underrated song, saying that it "features one of his rawest vocals tracks ever" and also praising the "stomping rhythm and whimsical backup vocals."

Personnel
 Paul McCartney – lead vocals, bass, piano
 Linda McCartney – backing vocals
 David Spinozza or Hugh McCracken – guitar
 Denny Seiwell – drums
 Heather McCartney – backing vocals

Cover versions
In 1972, Bahamian musician Exuma recorded a cover of "Monkberry Moon Delight", which was included on his album Reincarnation. The following year, Screamin' Jay Hawkins recorded a cover of the song and released it as a single.

References

1971 songs
Songs written by Paul McCartney
Songs written by Linda McCartney
Song recordings produced by Paul McCartney
Paul McCartney songs
Music published by MPL Music Publishing